John Anders Skoglund (born 1 October 1971) is a retired Norwegian football striker.

He played youth football for Rælingen FK. He later joined Holter IF, and scored 20 goals in the 1996 Norwegian Second Division season. As a result, he was signed by Norwegian Premier League team Vålerenga IF. However, he did not become an immediate success, and was loaned out to Skjetten SK in the middle of the 1998 season. Ahead of the 1999 season he joined Ullensaker/Kisa IL. He left this club after the 2002 season, and was later on the books of Gjerdrum IL in the lower divisions.

References

1971 births
Living people
Norwegian footballers
Vålerenga Fotball players
Skjetten SK players
Ullensaker/Kisa IL players
People from Akershus
Eliteserien players
Association football forwards
Sportspeople from Viken (county)